Volutaxiella is a genus of sea snails, marine gastropod mollusks in the family Pyramidellidae, the pyrams and their allies.

Species
Species within the genus Volutaxiella include:
 Volutaxiella subantarctica Strebel, 1908
 Volutaxiella translucens Strebel, 1908

References

External links
 To World Register of Marine Species

Pyramidellidae
Monotypic gastropod genera